The 2000–01 West Coast Hockey League season was the sixth season of the West Coast Hockey League, a North American minor professional league. Nine teams participated in the regular season, and the San Diego Gulls were the league champions.

Regular season

Taylor Cup-Playoffs

External links
 Season 2000/01 on hockeydb.com

West Coast Hockey League seasons
WCHL